Red Hook is a town located on the east side of Saint Thomas in the East End subdistrict. Referred to as Red Hook, the East End features an unofficial "town" of red-tiled roof homes and businesses dotting a rolling coastline that overlooks Pillsbury Sound and the island of St. John. Red Hook hosts several hotels, marinas, a busy port, and other key items of the east side of St. Thomas (East End (pop. 7,672)).

Ferry service is provided from Red Hook to Cruz Bay on St. John USVI and to the British Virgin Islands.

References

Populated places in Saint Thomas, U.S. Virgin Islands
East End, Saint Thomas, U.S. Virgin Islands